Naughty Boys may refer to:
 Naughty Boys (album), a 1983 album by Yellow Magic Orchestra
 Naughty Boys (film), a 1986 Hong Kong martial arts crime comedy film